Bashkirskaya Urginka (Başqort Ürgene) is a rural locality (a village) in Novopetrovsky Selsoviet, Zianchurinsky District, Bashkortostan, Russia. The population was 866 as of 2010. There are 9 streets.

Geography 
Bashkirskaya Urginka is located 15 km southwest of Isyangulovo (the district's administrative centre) by road. Novopetrovskoye is the nearest rural locality.

References 

Rural localities in Zianchurinsky District